David Goodman Croly (November 3, 1829 – April 29, 1889) was an American journalist, born in New York City and educated at New York University.  He was associated with the Evening Post and the Herald (1854–58), and then became an editor and subsequently the managing editor of the World. He married Jane Cunningham, known as "Jennie June", in 1856. In 1863, during the Civil War, he co-authored the anonymous pamphlet Miscegenation, which  tried to discredit the abolitionist movement and the Lincoln Administration by playing on racist fears common among whites. The anonymous author of the pamphlet claimed to be an Abolitionist in favour of promoting the intermarriage of whites and blacks, a taboo practice that at the time was seen as a threat to white supremacy. The pamphlet coined the term miscegenation for the intermixing of races.

From 1870 to 1873, Croly published a journal called Modern Thinker which served as a vehicle for the positivist and Spencerian positions of himself and a small circle of colleagues, including John Humphrey Noyes. In 1872, Croly predicted the Panic of 1873, along with the failures of Jay Cooke & Co. and the Northern Pacific Railroad.  From 1873 to 1878 he was editor of the Daily Graphic.

Croly's published works include Seymour and Blair: Their Lives and Services (1868), about the 19th century politicians Horatio Seymour and Montgomery Blair (which included an appendix containing a "History of Reconstruction"); and a Primer of Positivism (1876). This refers to Comtean positivism as he was a founding figure in the New York City branch of the Church of Humanity and referred to the "faith" as "the only true church." Glimpses of the future : suggestions as to the drift of things (1888) was an early instance of futurology.

David Goodman Croly was the father of the writer Herbert Croly, co-founder of The New Republic magazine.

References

Sources
 

19th-century American historians
19th-century American male writers
Journalists from New York City
New York University alumni
Comtism
1829 births
1889 deaths
19th-century American journalists
American male journalists
Irish emigrants to the United States (before 1923)
American male non-fiction writers
Historians from New York (state)